Recognized effects of higher acute radiation doses are described in more detail in the article on radiation poisoning. Although the International System of Units (SI) defines the sievert (Sv) as the unit of radiation dose equivalent, chronic radiation levels and standards are still often given in units of millirems (mrem), where 1 mrem equals 1/1,000 of a rem and 1 rem equals 0.01 Sv. Light radiation sickness begins at about 50–100 rad (0.5–1 gray (Gy), 0.5–1 Sv, 50–100 rem, 50,000–100,000 mrem).

The following table includes some dosages for comparison purposes, using millisieverts (mSv) (one thousandth of a sievert). The concept of radiation hormesis is relevant to this table – radiation hormesis is a hypothesis stating that the effects of a given acute dose may differ from the effects of an equal fractionated dose. Thus 100 mSv is considered twice in the table below – once as received over a 5-year period, and once as an acute dose, received over a short period of time, with differing predicted effects. The table describes doses and their official limits, rather than effects.

See also
Mars Radiation Environment Experiment (MARIE)

External links
unh.edu: The Carrington event: Possible doses to crews in space from a comparable event, received in 2004 and concludes an interplanetary dose for a Carrington event at 34 - 45 Gy depending on type of flare spectrum and using a 1 gram/cm2 aluminium shield (3.7 mm thick). Dose can be decreased down to 3 Gy through the use of a 10 gram/cm2 aluminium shield (3.7 cm thick).

References

Radiation